The Short North Historic District is a historic district in The Short North neighborhood of Columbus, Ohio. The district was listed on the National Register of Historic Places in 1990.

Gallery

See also
 National Register of Historic Places listings in Columbus, Ohio

References

National Register of Historic Places in Columbus, Ohio
Historic districts on the National Register of Historic Places in Ohio
1990 establishments in Ohio
Historic districts in Columbus, Ohio